The 1951 Swedish speedway season was the 1951 season of motorcycle speedway in Sweden.

Individual

Individual Championship
The 1951 Swedish Individual Speedway Championship final was held on 12 October in Stockholm. Helge Brinkeback won the Swedish Championship for the second consecutive year.

Team

Team Championship
Vargarna won division 1 and were declared the winners of the Swedish Speedway Team Championship. The team included Dan Forsberg, Helge Brinkeback and Olle Nygren.

Vikingarna won division 2 east and Kaparna won division 2 west.

See also 
 Speedway in Sweden

References

Speedway leagues
Professional sports leagues in Sweden
Swedish
Seasons in Swedish speedway